Étienne Mayrand (September 3, 1776 – January 22, 1872) was a Quebec businessman and political figure.

He was born in Montreal in 1776 and went on to work in the fur trade with the North West Company. He established a business in grain and hay at Rivière-du-Loup (later Louiseville in Maskinongé County), also expanding into real estate and money lending. Mayrand served in the militia as an officer during the War of 1812, becoming captain and, in 1846, major. He also held several posts as commissioner in Lower Canada. He was elected to the Legislative Assembly of Lower Canada for Saint-Maurice County in 1816. Mayrand served as a member of the Special Council which governed the province following the Lower Canada Rebellion and was named to the Legislative Council of the Province of Canada in June 1841. He resigned from the council later that same month.

He was married four times: 
 first to a native woman, who bore him two daughters, during his time with the North West Company
 then, to Sophie Héneau from Berthier
 thirdly, to Thérèse Heney at Montreal
 finally, to Félicité Le Maitre-Bellenoix, the widow of Louis Gauvreau, a Quebec merchant

He died in Rivière-du-Loup (Louiseville) in 1872.

His grandson, Hormidas Mayrand, later served in the Canadian House of Commons.

External links
 

1776 births
1872 deaths
Members of the Legislative Assembly of Lower Canada
Members of the Special Council of Lower Canada
Members of the Legislative Council of the Province of Canada